Lair of the Clockwork God is a platforming and point-and-click game developed and published by Size Five Games for Microsoft Windows, macOS, Linux, Nintendo Switch, Xbox One and PlayStation 4 in 2020. It is the third game in the Ben and Dan Series.

Gameplay
Lair of the Clockwork God is a two-dimensional side-scroller. Ben is controlled by the conventional point-and-click style, whereas Dan is controlled as a platformer, on a mission to recover a flower that can cure cancer.

Reception
The game received generally favorable reviews, according to review aggregator Metacritic. According to Rock, Paper, Shotgun, Lair of the Clockwork God has a firm grasp on comedy, calling it a stress test for the rib cage. It goes on to say that it  "celebrates the tension between old and new, and finds profound comedy in the juxtaposition". Per The Guardian, the game strikes an impressive balance between point and click games and platformers.

References

2020 video games
Point-and-click adventure games
Linux games
MacOS games
Side-scrolling platform games
Video games developed in the United Kingdom
Windows games
Nintendo Switch games
PlayStation 4 games
Xbox One games
Size Five Games games
Single-player video games